The UQAM Citadins are the athletic teams that represent the Université du Québec à Montréal in Montreal, Quebec and currently compete in the RSEQ conference of U Sports. The Citadins field varsity teams in badminton, basketball, cheerleading, cross country, soccer, and volleyball.

References

External links
 Official website

U Sports teams in Montreal
U Sports teams in Quebec
Université du Québec à Montréal